Suresh Chand Jain is an Indian politician and member of the Bharatiya Janata Party. Jain was a member of the Uttarakhand Legislative Assembly from the Roorkee constituency in Haridwar district.

References 

Bharatiya Janata Party politicians from Uttarakhand
Members of the Uttarakhand Legislative Assembly
Living people
21st-century Indian politicians
Year of birth missing (living people)